The Olympic Games ceremonies of the Ancient Olympic Games were an integral part of these Games; the modern Olympic games have opening, closing, and medal ceremonies. Some of the elements of the modern ceremonies date back to the Ancient Games from which the Modern Olympics draw their ancestry. An example of this is the prominence of Greece in both the opening and closing ceremonies. During the 2004 Games, the medal winners received a crown of olive branches, which was a direct reference to the Ancient Games, in which the victor's prize was an olive wreath. The various elements of the ceremonies are mandated by the Olympic Charter, and cannot be changed by the host nation. This requirement of seeking the approval of the International Olympic Committee (IOC) includes the artistic portion of opening and closing ceremonies.

The ceremonies have evolved over the centuries. Ancient Games incorporated ceremonies to mark the beginning and ending of each successive game. There are similarities and differences between the ancient Olympic ceremonies and their modern counterparts. While the presentation of the Games has evolved with improvements in technology and the desire of the host nations to showcase their own artistic expression, the basic events of each ceremony have remained unchanged. The presentation of the Opening and Closing Ceremonies continue to increase in scope, scale, and expense with each successive celebration of the Games, but they are still steeped in tradition.

Ancient forerunners 
The Ancient Games, held in Greece from ca. 776 BC to ca. 393 AD, provide the first examples of Olympic ceremonies.  The victory celebration, elements of which are in evidence in the modern-day medal and closing ceremonies, often involved elaborate feasts, drinking, singing, and the recitation of poetry.  The wealthier the victor, the more extravagant the celebration.  The victors were presented with an olive wreath or crown harvested from a special tree in Olympia by a boy, specially selected for this purpose, using a golden sickle.  The festival would conclude with the victors making solemn vows and performing ritual sacrifices to the various gods to which they were beholden.

There is evidence of dramatic changes in the format of the Ancient Games over the nearly 12 centuries that they were celebrated.  Eventually, by roughly the 77th Olympiad, a standard 18-event program was established.  In order to open a Games in ancient Greece the organizers would hold an Inauguration Festival.  This was followed by a ceremony in which athletes took an oath of sportsmanship.  The first competition, an artistic competition of trumpeters and heralds, concluded the opening festivities.

Opening 

The Olympic opening ceremony represents the official commencement of an Olympic Games.  In recent Olympics, some competition has begun prior to the opening ceremony.  For example, the football competitions for both men and women at the 2008 Summer Olympics began two days prior to the opening ceremony. Due to the entry of new events in the Olympic program, common since the 2014 Winter Olympics, some sports have also started before the opening ceremonies. The 2020 Summer Olympics and the 2022 Winter Olympics were the two events had held behind closed doors due to the COVID-19 pandemic strict protocols, the latter took place with some invited guests only.

As mandated by the Olympic Charter, various elements frame the Opening Ceremony of a celebration of the Olympic Games. Most of these rituals were canonized at the 1920 Summer Olympics in Antwerp, Belgium.

Time of day
Since the 1996 Summer Olympics, the opening ceremonies have generally been held on a Friday evening. The opening ceremonies were held in the evening for the first time at the 1992 Winter Olympics, albeit on a Saturday. To facilitate a live, prime time broadcast on Friday night in the Americas, the 1988 Summer Olympics opening ceremony in Seoul, South Korea was held in the morning local time, a move that faced criticism from athletes due to the excessive heat.  Generally, no competition is scheduled on the day of the opening ceremony; between 1992 and 2021, this practice was codified in the Olympic Charter; however, some certain events like rowing preliminaries were held earlier in the morning on the opening day of the 2020 Summer Olympics.

The last opening ceremony held during the daytime hours was that of the 1998 Winter Olympics in Nagano, Japan; the scheduling was chosen for logistical reasons connected to its grand finale, which featured a live, synchronized performance by five international choirs, linked to the ceremony venue via satellite.

Artistic program
The artistic program is what creates the idiosyncratic element of each ceremony. Coubertin's initial vision of the Modern Olympics featured both athletic competitions and artistic achievements.  As the modern Olympics have evolved into a celebration of sport, it is in the opening ceremony that one can see the most of Coubertin's ideal. The opening ceremony are an important ritual of the Olympic games that represent a wide variety of features such as similar qualities and messages that link together local and global issues, as well as cultural similarities at the same scopes.

The artistic program of the ceremonies allows the host country to showcase its past,present and future in a comprehensive way. The  current protocols, ceremonies typically start with the authorities presentation which includes the entrance of the head of state or representative of the host country and the president of the International Olympic Committee followed by the raising of the country's flag and the performance of the national anthem. The host nation then presents artistic displays of music, singing, dance, and theater representative of its culture, history, and the current Olympic game motto. Since the 1976 Winter Olympics in Innsbruck, the artistic presentations have continued to grow in scale and complexity. The 2008 Summer Olympics opening ceremony, for example, reportedly cost US$100 million, with much of the cost incurring in the artistic portion.

Each Opening Ceremony has a theme selected by the host nation and have to be connected with the cultural program of that edition. During all the acts of the ceremonies, the host country's goal is to represent their cultural identity. For example, in the 2008 Summer Olympics held in Beijing, the theme was “unity”. On May 12, 2008, only two months before the 2008 games, a devastating earthquake occurred in Sichuan. Chinese basketball legend Yao Ming was chosen to be the host country flagbearer, walking hand-in-hand on entering the stadium with Lin Hao, a nine-year-old boy who saved some of his classmates following the earthquake.

Parade of Nations
A traditional part of the opening ceremony starts with a "Parade of Nations", during which most participating athletes march into the stadium, delegation-by-delegation. It is not compulsory for athletes to participate in the opening ceremony. Some events of the Games may start on the day before, on the day, or the day after the ceremony; athletes competing in these early events may elect not to participate. Each delegation is led by a sign with the name of their nation or team, and by their flagbearer–typically a notable athlete of the delegation. As an act of gender equality, beginning in 2020 the IOC has allowed teams the option of having both a male and female flagbearer.

Since the 1928 Summer Olympics, Greece has traditionally entered first in honor of their role in the ancient Olympic Games, while the host nation has entered last. The 2004 opening ceremony provided a variation of this practice due to the Games being hosted by Greece; its flagbearer Pyrros Dimas led the parade on his own, while the rest of the Greek team entered last. Beginning with the 2020 Summer Olympics, the Refugee Olympic Team enters second after Greece, while the host nations of the next two Olympics enter in descending order as the final two teams before the host nation (in this case, the United States, France, and Japan were the final three countries, as hosts of the 2028, 2024, and 2020 Games).

The remaining delegations enter after Greece and before the host nation in alphabetical order, based on their name in the host nation's official language; for example, the three Olympics held in Canada have used either English or French (as both are considered official languages of Canada), while the 1980 Summer Games, 1984 Winter Games and 2014 Winter Games used Cyrillic, and the 2004 Summer Games used Modern Greek script. Host nations whose official languages do not use Latin script—especially Games held in Asia —have used different collation methods for the Parade of Nations; the 1988 Summer Olympics and the 2018 Winter Olympics were sorted by traditional Korean Hangul script, while the 2008 Summer Olympics and 2022 Winter Olympics in Beijing sorted by the number of strokes used to write their name using Simplified Chinese characters, and the 2020 Summer Olympics used the Gojūon ordering of Japanese kana.

There have been exceptions to this practice; in 1992, due to political disputes over the recognition of Catalonia (where the host city of Barcelona is located) as independent from Spain, and concerns over the Spanish language being given undue prominence over the Catalan language, all official announcements during the Games were conducted in French, Spanish, Catalan, and English (with the order of the latter three languages interspersed), and the Parade of Nations was performed based on their French names.

The organising committee for the 2024 Summer Olympics in Paris announced plans for its Parade of Nations to be conducted as a boat parade on the Seine river (with cultural presentations staged along the route), as part of their goals for the opening ceremony to be a public, non-ticketed event rather than be held in a traditional stadium setting. The plans call for the official protocol to take place at the Trocadéro.

Traditional events

After all nations have entered, the President of the Organizing Committee makes a speech, followed by the IOC president. At the end of his speech, he introduces the representative or head of state of the host country who officially declares the opening of the Games. Despite the Games having been awarded to a particular city and not to the country in general, the Olympic Charter presently requires the opener to be the host country's head of state. However, there have been many cases where someone other than the host country's head of state opened the Games. The first example was at the Games of the II Olympiad in Paris in 1900, which had no opening ceremony before as part of the 1900 World's Fair. There are five examples from the United States alone in which the Games were not opened by the head of state.

The Olympic Charter provides that the person designated to open the Games should do so by reciting whichever of the following lines is appropriate:

 If at the Games of the Olympiad (Summer Olympics): I declare open the Games of [name of the host city] celebrating the [ordinal number of the Olympiad] Olympiad of the modern era.
 If at the Winter Games: I declare open the [ordinal number] Olympic Winter Games of [name of the host city].

Before 1936, the opening official would often make a short welcoming speech before declaring the Games open. However, since 1936, when Adolf Hitler opened both the Garmisch Partenkirchen Winter Olympics and the Berlin Summer Olympics, the openers have used the standard formula.

There have been ten times the official has modified the wording of the said opening line. Recent editions of the Winter Games have seen a trend of using the first version instead of the second, which happened in the 2002, 2006 and 2010 Winter Games. Other modifications include:

 In 1964, Emperor Hirohito of Japan, and  Emperor Naruhito in 2020, opened the Summer Olympics in Tokyo by speaking in Japanese, albeit with slightly different translations:
"Celebrating the 18th/Commemorating the 32nd Modern Olympiad, I will declare the opening of the Olympic Games Tokyo competition here."

 In 1968, Mexican president Gustavo Díaz Ordaz declared the opening of the Games of Mexico City by speaking in Spanish:
"Today, 12 October 1968," and then the standard formula followed.

 In 1976, Elizabeth II, as Queen of Canada, opened the Montreal Olympics (first in French then in English) with:
"I declare open the Olympic Games of 1976, celebrating the XXI Olympiad of the modern era."

 In 1980, Soviet leader Leonid Brezhnev opened the Moscow Summer Olympics by speaking in Russian:
"Mr. President of International Olympic Committee! Comrades! I declare open the Olympic Games of 1980, celebrating the XXII Olympiad of the modern era."

 In 1984, U.S. president Ronald Reagan opened the Los Angeles Summer Olympics with:
"Celebrating the XXIII Olympiad of the modern era, I declare open the Olympic Games of Los Angeles."

 In 1992, King Juan Carlos I of Spain opened the Barcelona Summer Olympics with:
"(In Catalan) Welcome all to Barcelona. (In Spanish) Today, 25 July of the Year 1992," and then the standard formula followed.

 In 2002, U.S. president George W. Bush opened the Winter Olympics in Salt Lake City (which took place five months after the September 11 attacks) using the format of the Summer Games declaration with:
"On behalf of a proud, determined and grateful nation," and then the standard formula followed.

 In 2004, Konstantinos Stephanopoulos, the President of the Hellenic Republic, opened the 2004 Athens Summer Olympics by speaking in Greek:
"I declare the opening of the Olympic Games of Athens and the celebration of the XXVIII Olympiad of the modern era."

 In 2008, Hu Jintao, and in 2022, Xi Jinping, the Presidents of the People's Republic of China, opened the Beijing Summer Olympics and Winter Olympics, respectively, by speaking in Mandarin:
"I declare, the XXIX Olympic Games / XXIV Olympic Winter Games of Beijing, open!"

 In 2016, Brazilian vice president Michel Temer, as acting president during the suspension of President Dilma Rousseff, and unusually without an introduction, opened the Summer Olympics in Rio de Janeiro by speaking in Portuguese:
"After this wonderful spectacle," and then the standard formula followed.

Next, the Olympic flag is carried horizontally (since the 1960 Summer Olympics) or vertically (when the ceremonies are held indoor) into the stadium and hoisted as the Olympic Hymn is played. The Olympic Charter states that the Olympic flag must "fly for the entire duration of the Olympic Games from a flagpole placed in a prominent position in the main stadium". At most games, the flag has been carried into the stadium by prominent athletes of the host nation. Starting at the  Torino 2006 opening ceremony, the modified protocol created to allow a group of athletes and non-athletes famous for promoting Olympic values to carry the flag.

Until the 1992 Summer Olympics (except the 1994 Winter Olympics), flag bearers of all countries then circle a rostrum, where one athlete of the host nation (since the 1920 Summer Olympics), and one judge of the host nation (since the 1972 Summer Olympics) speak the Olympic Oath, declaring they will compete and judge according to the rules of their respective sport. Since the 2012 Summer Olympics in London, continuing with the tradition started at the 2010 Summer Youth Olympics a coach from the host nation speaks out the Olympic Oath. For the 2018 Winter Olympics in Pyeongchang, the three oaths are merged into one as the Unified Oath where one athlete, judge, and coach recite one line of the oath respectively before the athlete finishes it.

Olympic flame

The climax of an opening ceremony is the arrival of the Olympic flame, as the conclusion of the torch relay: the torch is typically passed a group of final torchbearers—typically reflecting the host nation's most prominent Olympic athletes. The final torchbearer(s), in turn, lights a cauldron inside or near the stadium–signifying, in earnest, the beginning of the Games. There have been exceptions to the final torchbearers being prominent sports figures: in 2012, to reflect the Games' slogan "Inspire a Generation", the cauldron was lit by a group of seven young athletes, each nominated by a notable British athlete. Due the lack of tradition in Winter Sports, the final torchbearers at the 2022 Winter Olympics reflected the history of China at the sports with athletes from different decades (beginning with the 1950s), the cauldron was lit by two Chinese skiers who was to compete on that Games.

Under IOC rules, the lighting of the Olympic cauldron must be witnessed by those attending the opening ceremony, implying that it must be lit at the location where the ceremony is taking place. Another IOC rule states that the cauldron should be witnessed outside by the entire residents of the entire host city. This rule was first made evident for the first time during the 2010 Winter Olympics opening ceremony in Vancouver, which was hosted by BC Place—then a domed, indoor stadium. While a multi-armed cauldron was jointly lit by Nancy Greene, Steve Nash, and Wayne Gretzky during the opening ceremony (due to a malfunction, a fourth arm meant to be lit by Catriona Le May Doan did not rise), Gretzky was escorted outside to light a second, public cauldron at Jack Poole Plaza.

During the 2012 Summer Olympics in London, the cauldron located inside the Olympic Stadium was not visible from outside of the stadium. The image of the lit cauldron was projected on the stadium's rooftop screens during the first week of competition, and live footage was available to broadcasters. 

The notion of a public cauldron displayed outside of the ceremonies venue, and lit following the opening ceremony, was adopted by several subsequent Olympics since Vancouver, such as 2016 at the Candelária Church plaza, and 2020 in Ariake, Tokyo. The 2022 Winter Olympics had three public cauldrons located, the main outside of the Beijing National Stadium,and the another one at the Yanqing District, and a one at  Zhangjiakou — reflecting the three main zones of the Games' venues.

Doves

Beginning at the post-World War I 1920 Summer Olympics, the lighting of the Olympic flame was followed by the release of doves, symbolizing peace. (Experienced athletes brought newspapers to cover themselves because of the birds' droppings.) The release was discontinued after several doves perched themselves at the cauldron's rim and were burned alive by the Olympic flame during the opening ceremony of the 1988 Summer Olympics in Seoul. It was later replaced with a symbolic release of doves after the flame has been lit.

In the 2000 ceremony, a dove image was projected on an enormous white cloth held by the athletes on the stadium floor. In 2004, an LED screen was used. In 2006, acrobats formed the shape of a dove. The 2008 ceremony had yellow fireworks and the people made birds with hands representing doves. In 2010, dove figures were projected on the stage floor. The 2012 ceremony had bicyclists with dove-wings, lit by LEDs. In the 2014 ceremony several dancers, holding strands of blue LED lights, danced on the shape of a dove projected on the stadium floor. In the 2016 ceremony, children with dove shaped kites were seen running with the first Olympic Laurel winner, Kipchoge Keino. In the 2018 ceremony, a dove shape was made by the performers by passing candlelight and was accompanied by the song "Imagine" by John Lennon. In the 2020 ceremony, the doves were made of paper and were flown by the performers.

Medal presentation

After each Olympic event is completed, a medal ceremony is held. The Summer Games usually conduct medal ceremonies immediately after the event at the respective venues. Winter editions, however, would present the medals at a nightly victory ceremony held at a medal plaza, excluding the indoor and specific events. This is because due to the altitude of some Winter events, presenting medals may be difficult in said environments. A three–tiered rostrum is used for the three medal winners, with the gold medal winner ascending to the highest platform, in the centre, with the silver and bronze medalists flanking. The medals are awarded by a member of the IOC. The IOC member is usually accompanied by a person from the sports federation governing the sport (such as IAAF in athletics or FINA in swimming), who presents each athlete with a small bouquet of flowers. When the Games were held in Athens in 2004, the medal winners also received olive wreaths in honor of the tradition at the Ancient Olympics. At the 2016 Summer Olympics, for the first time in history, the flowers were replaced by a small 3D model of the Games' logo. At the 2018 Winter Olympic Games, the flowers were replaced by a special version of the plush toy of the mascot dressed in historical Korean clothing. After medals are distributed, the flags of the nations of the three medalists are raised. The flag of the gold medalist's country is in the centre and raised the highest while the flag of the silver medalist's country is on the left facing the flags and the flag of the bronze medalist's country is on the right, both at lower elevations than the gold medalist's country's flag. Should there have been multiple athletes tied for gold medal (as it was the case for examples like the two gold medalists for men's high jump at the 2020 Summer Olympics), the national anthems (if from multiple NOCs) will be played in the alphabetical order according to the medalists' surnames.

The flags are raised while the national anthem of the gold medalist's country plays. Citizens of the host country also act as hosts during the medal ceremonies. They aid the officials who present the medals and act as flag bearers.

Strict rules govern the conduct of athletes during the medal ceremony. For example, they are required to wear only pre-approved outfits that are standard for the athlete's national Olympic team.  They are not allowed to display any political affiliation or make a political statement while on the medal stand. The most famous violation of this rule was the Black Power salute of Tommie Smith and John Carlos at the 1968 Summer Olympics in Mexico City.

For their actions, IOC president Avery Brundage demanded their expulsion from the Olympics. After the United States Olympic Committee (USOC) refused to do so, Brundage threatened to remove the entire United States track and field team from the Olympics. Following this, the USOC complied, and Smith and Carlos were expelled.

As is customary, since the 2020 Summer Olympics men's and women's marathon medals (at the Summer Olympics) and since the 2014 Winter Olympics, men's 50 km and women's 30 km cross-country skiing medals (at the Winter Olympics) are awarded as part of the Closing Ceremony, which take place on the penultimate and the last days, in the Olympic Stadium, and traditionally are the last medal presentation of the Games.

Closing

In contrast to the opening ceremony, many elements of the Olympic closing ceremony gradually developed more by tradition than official mandate.

Like the opening ceremony, the closing ceremony begins with the authorities presentation followed by the raising of the host country's flag and a performance of its national anthem, followed by an artistic program. The artistic program is usually shorter than that of the opening ceremony.

The traditional part of the closing ceremony starts with the "Parade of Flags", where flag bearers from each participating country enter the stadium in single file, with the Greek flag in the lead and the host nation's flag bringing up the rear. Behind them march all of the athletes without any distinction or grouping by nationality. This "Parade of Athletes," the blending of all the athletes, is a tradition that began during the 1956 Summer Olympics at the suggestion of Melbourne schoolboy John Ian Wing, who thought it would be a way of bringing the athletes of the world together as "one nation." Prior to the 1956 Games, no Olympic Team had ever marched in the closing ceremony of the Modern or the Ancient Games. It was the very first International Peace March ever to be staged.

After all the athletes enter the stadium, the final medals ceremony of the Games is held. The organizing committee of the respective host city, after consulting with the IOC, determines which event will have its medals presented. During the Summer Olympics, this is usually the men's and (as of 2020) women's marathons. Traditionally, the men's marathon is held in the last day of competition on the last day of the Olympics, and the race is finished some hours before the start of the closing ceremony. However, recent Summer Olympiads in Atlanta, Athens, Beijing, Rio and Tokyo (although 2020's marathons were held in Sapporo, 500 miles away) staged the men's marathon in the early morning hours due the climate conditions in the host city. Since the 2006 Winter Olympics, the medals for the men's 50 km cross-country skiing event and starting on 2014 the woman's 30 km cross-country skiing event were presented at the closing ceremony.

The newly elected members of the IOC Athletes' Commission then present a bouquet of flowers to a representative of the volunteers, as a thank you to them for their work during the Games.

Next, the handover ceremony starts with  two other national flags are hoisted on flagpoles one at a time while the corresponding national anthems are played: first, the flag of Greece to again honor the birthplace of the Olympic Games is played first, and the flag of the country hosting the next Summer or Winter Olympic Games. "Hymn to Liberty", the national anthem of Greece, has been performed at every closing ceremony of the Olympic Games. At Moscow, Soviet Union, during the 1980 Summer Olympics boycott in protest of the Soviet invasion of Afghanistan, the City of Los Angeles was raised to represent the next games host instead of the flag of the United States to the sound of "Ode to Joy", a break from the tradition that was initiated by the host nation. In Sydney and Athens, two Greek flags were raised because Greece was hosting the 2004 games. Then, while the Olympic Hymn is played, the Olympic flag that was hoisted during the opening ceremony is lowered from the flagpole and carried from the stadium.

In what is known as the Antwerp Ceremony (because the tradition began at the Antwerp Games), the current mayor of the city that organized the Games transfers the official Olympic flag to the president of the IOC, who then passes it on to the current mayor of the city hosting the next Olympic Games. The receiving mayor then waves the flag eight times. During the ceremony, the mayor of the current host city stands on the left, the president of the IOC stands in the middle, and the mayor of the next host city stands on the right. Until the 1984 Summer Olympic Games this ceremony was held during the Opening Ceremonies. During the ages five flags are used:
 
 The Antwerp flag was presented to the IOC at the 1920 Summer Olympics by the city of Antwerp, Belgium, and was passed on to the next organizing city of the Summer Olympics through the 1984 Summer Games in Los Angeles, United States,when this flag wore out over time and ended up tearing.
 The Oslo flag was used during the Winter Games and was presented to the IOC at the 1952 Winter Olympics by the city of Oslo, Norway, and is passed on to the next organizing city of the Winter Olympics. This flag was used until the 2014 Games in Sochi, Russia when this flag also wore out over time and ended up tearing.
 The Seoul flag was presented to the IOC at the 1988 Summer Olympics by the city of Seoul, South Korea  as a replacement for the Antwerp flag. This flag was used until the 2012 Games in London, Great Britain.
 The Rio flag was presented to the IOC at the 2016 Summer Olympics by the city of Rio de Janeiro, Brazil as a replacement for the Seoul flag. It is currently passed on to the next organizing city of the Summer Olympics. 
 The PyeongChang flag was presented to the IOC at the 2018 Winter Olympics by the city of PyeongChang, South Korea as a replacement for the Oslo flag. It is currently passed on to the next organizing city of the Winter Olympics.

This portion of the ceremony actually took place at the opening ceremony until the 1984 Summer Games and the 1988 Winter Games.

The next host nation then introduces itself with artistic displays of dance and theater representative of that country or city. This tradition began with the 1976 Summer Olympics.

Afterwards, the President of the Organizing Committee makes a speech. The IOC President then makes a speech before closing the Olympics by saying:And now, I declare the Games of the [ordinal number of Summer Olympics] Olympiad/[ordinal number of Winter Olympics] Olympic Winter Games closed; and in accordance with our tradition, I call upon the youth of the world to assemble, four years from now, in [name of next host city] to celebrate with us; the Games of the [subsequent ordinal number of Summer Olympics] Olympiad/[subsequent ordinal number of Winter Olympics] Olympic Winter Games.If the next Olympic Games is not scheduled for four years after the current one, the IOC president will instead reference the different timeframe. For instance, the 2020 Summer Olympics were postponed to 2021 due to the COVID-19 pandemic, so IOC President Thomas Bach instead stated "I call upon the youth of the world to assemble, three years from now, in Paris." A similar situation occurred at the 1992 Winter Olympics, which were held only two years before the next Winter Olympics in 1994 so that the Summer and Winter Games would be in different years moving forward. Unlike the opening ceremony, the head of state or representative of the host country does not give a speech at the closing ceremony.

Finally, the Olympic flame is extinguished, marking the end of the Games.

Following the conclusion of the ceremony protocol, it is not uncommon for the ceremony to continue on with an "afterparty" of concert performances as a finale; the 2010 closing ceremony featured various Canadian musicians, the 2012 closing ceremony featured a headlining performance by British rock band The Who, the 2016 closing ceremony featured a tribute to the Rio Carnival, and 2018's while the closing ceremony focused on the Korean Wave moviment.The IOC also added a performance by the french DJ Martin Garrix.

References 

 
Articles containing video clips